is a railway station on the Hokuriku Railroad Asanogawa Line in Uchinada, Japan, operated by the private railway operator Hokuriku Railroad (Hokutetsu).

Lines

Station layout
The station consists of one side platform serving a single dead-headed track. The station is staffed.

Adjacent stations

History

Uchinada Station opened on 6 January 1929. It was relocated 100 meters from its original location and a new station building was constructed on 6 January 1960.

Surrounding area
 Midoridai Community Center
 Hokkoku Bank Uchinada Branch
 Kanazawa Medical University
 Hamanasu Junior High School
 Mukaiawagasaki Elementary School
 Seiko Elementary School
 Tsurugaoka Elementary School
 Uchinada Town Office
 Tsurugaoka Post Office

Passengers statistics

See also
 List of railway stations in Japan

External links

  

Railway stations in Ishikawa Prefecture
Railway stations in Japan opened in 1929
Hokuriku Railroad Asanogawa Line
Uchinada, Ishikawa